Foxglove is a common name of Digitalis.

Foxglove may also refer to:

Biology
 Foxglove-tree, a nickname for Paulownia tomentosa
 Chinese foxglove (Rehmannia), specifically
Rehmannia elata
 Foxglove beardtongue
 Foxglove pug, a European moth

Entertainment
 Foxglove (DC Comics), a fictional character from The Sandman graphic novels
 Foxglove, an enemy in the Way of the Tiger gamebook series
 Foxglove Summer, a novel published in 2014

Places
 Foxglove Oval, an athletic park in New South Wales, Australia
 Foxglove Covert, a nature reserve in North Yorkshire, England

Transportation
 , a British Royal Navy sloop launched in 1915 and scrapped in 1946
 Mikoyan Project 1.42, NATO reporting name "Foxglove", a technology demonstrator aircraft

See also
 False foxglove (disambiguation)